The New Zealand Resident Doctors' Association (NZRDA) is a trade union in New Zealand and represents the professional and industrial interests of Resident Medical Officers (RMOs), including trainee interns, house surgeons, senior house officers and registrars, in New Zealand District Health Boards.

External links
 NZ Resident Doctors' Association official site.

New Zealand Council of Trade Unions
Healthcare trade unions in New Zealand